This is a list of all short stories published by science-fiction author Harry Harrison, along with the collections they appeared in, if any.

References

 
Literature lists
Harrison, Harry
American literature-related lists